Ambrogio Torriano (died 1679) was a Roman Catholic prelate who served as Bishop of Como (1666–1679).

Biography
Ambrogio Torriano was born in the village of Indovero in the comune of Casargo, Italy.
In the papal consistory of 15 December 1666 he was appointed by Pope Alexander VII as Bishop of Como.
On 21 December 1666 he was consecrated bishop by Benedetto Odescalchi, Cardinal-Priest of Sant'Onofrio, with Giacomo de Angelis, Archbishop of Urbino, and Marco Galli, Bishop of Rimini, serving as co-consecrators. 
He served as Bishop of Como until his death on 9 October 1679.

References

External links and additional sources
 (for Chronology of Bishops) 
 (for Chronology of Bishops) 

17th-century Italian Roman Catholic bishops
Bishops appointed by Pope Alexander VII
1679 deaths